The 1788–1789 United States presidential election was the first quadrennial presidential election. It was held from Monday, December 15, 1788, to Saturday, January 10, 1789, under the new Constitution ratified that same year. George Washington was unanimously elected for the first of his two terms as president and John Adams became the first vice president. This was the only U.S. presidential election that spanned two calendar years without a contingent election and the first national presidential election in American history.

Under the Articles of Confederation, which were ratified in 1781, the United States had no head of state. The executive function of government remained with the legislative similar to countries that use a parliamentary system. Federal power, strictly limited, was reserved to the Congress of the Confederation whose "President of the United States in Congress Assembled" was also chair of the Committee of the States which aimed to fulfill a function similar to that of the modern Cabinet.

The Constitution created the offices of President and Vice President, fully separating these offices from Congress. The Constitution established an Electoral College, based on each state's Congressional representation, in which each elector would cast two votes for two candidates, a procedure modified in 1804 by the ratification of the Twelfth Amendment. States had varying methods for choosing presidential electors. In five states, the state legislature chose electors. The other six chose electors through some form involving a popular vote, though in only two states did the choice depend directly on a statewide vote.

The enormously popular Washington was distinguished as the former Commander of the Continental Army during the American Revolutionary War. After he agreed to come out of retirement, he was elected with ease unanimously; Washington did not select a running mate as that concept was not yet developed.

No formal political parties existed, though an informally organized consistent difference of opinion had already manifested between Federalists and Anti-Federalists. Thus, the contest for the Vice-Presidency was open. Thomas Jefferson predicted that a popular Northern leader such as Governor John Hancock of Massachusetts or John Adams, a former minister to Great Britain who had represented Massachusetts in Congress, would be elected vice president. Anti-Federalist leaders such as Patrick Henry, who did not run, and George Clinton, who had opposed ratification of the Constitution, also represented potential choices.

All 69 electors cast one vote for Washington, making his election unanimous. Adams won 34 electoral votes and the vice presidency. The remaining 35 electoral votes were split among 10 candidates, including John Jay, who finished third with nine electoral votes. Three states were ineligible to participate in the election: New York's legislature did not choose electors on time, and North Carolina and Rhode Island had not ratified the constitution yet. Washington was inaugurated in New York City on April 30, 1789, 57 days after the First Congress convened.

Candidates
Though no organized political parties yet existed, political opinion loosely divided between those who had more stridently and enthusiastically endorsed ratification of the Constitution, called Federalists or Cosmopolitans, and Anti-Federalists or Localists who had only more reluctantly, skeptically, or conditionally supported, or who had outright opposed ratification. Both factions supported Washington for president. Limited, primitive political campaigning occurred in states and localities where swaying public opinion might matter. For example, in Maryland, a state with a statewide popular vote, unofficial parties campaigned locally, advertising.

Federalist candidates

Anti-Federalist candidates

General election

No nomination process existed at the time of planning, and thus, the framers of the Constitution presumed that Washington would be elected unopposed. For example, Alexander Hamilton spoke for national opinion when in a letter to Washington attempting to persuade him to leave retirement on his farm in Mount Vernon to serve as the first President, he wrote that "...the point of light in which you stand at home and abroad will make an infinite difference in the respectability in which the government will begin its operations in the alternative of your being or not being the head of state."

Another uncertainty was the choice for the vice presidency, which contained no definite job description beyond being the President's designated successor and presiding over the Senate. The Constitution stipulated that the position would be awarded to the runner-up in the Presidential election. Because Washington was from Virginia, then the largest state, many assumed that electors would choose a vice president from a northern state.  In an August 1788 letter, U.S. Minister to France Thomas Jefferson wrote that he considered John Adams and John Hancock, both from Massachusetts, to be the top contenders. Jefferson suggested John Jay, John Rutledge, and Virginian James Madison as other possible candidates. Adams received 34 electoral votes, one short of a majority – because the Constitution did not require an outright majority in the Electoral College prior to ratification of the Twelfth Amendment to elect a runner-up as vice president, Adams was elected to that post.

Voter turnout comprised a low single-digit percentage of the adult population. Though all states allowed some rudimentary form of popular vote, only six ratifying states allowed any form of popular vote specifically for presidential electors.  In most states only white men, and in many only those who owned property, could vote. Free black men could vote in four Northern states, and women could vote in New Jersey until 1776. In some states, there was a nominal religious test for voting. For example, in Massachusetts and Connecticut, the Congregational Church was established, supported by taxes.
Voting was hampered by poor communications and infrastructure and the labor demands imposed by farming. Two months passed after the election before the votes were counted and Washington was notified that he had been elected president. Washington spent eight days traveling from Virginia to New York for the inauguration. Congress took twenty-eight days to assemble.

As the electors were selected, politics intruded, and the process was not free of rumors and intrigue.  For example, Hamilton aimed to ensure that Adams did not inadvertently tie Washington in the electoral vote. Also, Federalists spread rumors that Anti-Federalists plotted to elect Richard Henry Lee or Patrick Henry president, with George Clinton as vice president. However, Clinton received only three electoral votes.

Results

Popular vote

Source: United States Presidential Elections, 1788-1860: The Official Results by Michael J. Dubin

 Only six of the 11 states eligible to cast electoral votes chose electors by any form of popular vote.
 Less than 1.8% of the population voted: the 1790 Census would count a total population of 3.0 million with a free population of 2.4 million and 600,000 slaves in those states casting electoral votes.
 Those states that did choose electors by popular vote had widely varying restrictions on suffrage via property requirements.

Electoral vote

Source: 
Source (popular vote): A New Nation Votes: American Election Returns 1787–1825

 Only 6 of the 10 states casting electoral votes chose electors by any form of the popular vote.
 Less than 1.8% of the population voted: the 1790 Census would count a total population of 3.0 million with a free population of 2.4 million and 600,000 slaves in those states casting electoral votes.
 Those states that did choose electors by popular vote had widely varying restrictions on suffrage via property requirements.
 As the New York legislature failed to appoint its allotted eight electors in time, there were no voting electors from New York.
 Two electors from Maryland did not vote.
 One elector from Virginia did not vote and another elector from Virginia was not chosen because an election district failed to submit returns.
 The identity of this candidate comes from The Documentary History of the First Federal Elections (Gordon DenBoer (ed.), University of Wisconsin Press, 1984, p. 441). Several respected sources, including the Biographical Directory of the United States Congress and the Political Graveyard, instead show this individual to be James Armstrong of Pennsylvania. However, primary sources, such as the Senate Journal, list only Armstrong's name, not his state. Skeptics observe that Armstrong received his single vote from a Georgia elector. They find this improbable because Armstrong of Pennsylvania was not nationally famous—his public service to that date consisted of being a medical officer during the American Revolution and, at most, a single year as a Pennsylvania judge.

Results by state

Popular vote
The popular vote totals used are the elector from each party with the highest vote totals.  The vote totals of Virginia appear to be incomplete.

Electoral vote
Sixty-nine electors voted out of a possible 91. (Two electors from Maryland and two from Virginia neglected to vote; the New York State Legislature was deadlocked and no electors were appointed from that state.) As per the terms of the unamended constitution, each elector was permitted two votes for president, with a majority of "the whole number of electors appointed" necessary to elect a president. Of the 69 participating electors, each cast one vote for Washington, who was elected president. Of the remaining candidates, only Adams, Jay, and Hancock received votes from more than one state; with 34 votes, Adams finished second behind only Washington, and by virtue of which fact was elected vice president.

Source:

Failure of New York to appoint electors
Control of the bicameral New York State Legislature was divided following ratification of the federal constitution, and lawmakers could not reach an agreement to appoint electors for the forthcoming presidential contest. Federalists, backed by the great landed families and the city commercial interests, were the largest faction in the Senate, the smaller of the two chambers for which roughly a quarter of the state's free white male population was eligible to vote; but in the House of Representatives, with its larger membership and electorate, Anti-federalists representing the middling interests held the majority. The fight to ratify the United States Constitution was still fresh in the memories of the legislators, and the Anti-federalists were resentful for have been forced by events to accept the constitution without amendments. Bills to govern the selection of electors were proposed in each house and rejected by the other, leading to an impasse. The deadlock still stood on January 7, 1789, the last day for electors to be chosen by the states, and New York thus failed to appoint the eight electors allocated to it by the constitution.

Electoral college selection
The Constitution, in Article II, Section 1, provided that the state legislatures should decide the manner in which their Electors were chosen. State legislatures chose different methods:

 New York's legislature did not choose electors on time.
 One electoral district failed to choose an elector.

See also
 1788–89 United States House of Representatives elections
 1788–89 United States Senate elections
 History of the United States (1789–1849)

Footnotes

References

Bibliography

 Bowling, Kenneth R., and Donald R. Kennon. "A New Matrix for National Politics." Inventing Congress: Origins and Establishment of the First Federal Congress. Athens, O.: United States Capitol Historical Society by Ohio U, 1999. 110–37. Print.
 Chernow, Ron (2004). "Alexander Hamilton". London, UK: Penguin Books. .
 Collier, Christopher. "Voting and American Democracy." The American People as Christian White Men of Property:Suffrage and Elections in Colonial and Early National America. N.p.: U of Connecticut, n.d, 1999.
 
 Dinkin, Robert J. Voting in Revolutionary America: A Study of Elections in the Original Thirteen States, 1776–1789. Westport, CT: Greenwood, 1982.
 
 
 
 Novotny, Patrick. The Parties in American Politics, 1789–2016.
 Paullin, Charles O. "The First Elections Under The Constitution." The Iowa Journal of History and Politics 2 (1904): 3-33. Web. February 20, 2017.
 Shade, William G., and Ballard C. Campbell. "The Election of 1788-89." American Presidential Campaigns and Elections. Ed. Craig R. Coenen. Vol. 1. Armonk, NY: Sharpe Reference, 2003. 65–77. Print.

External links

 Presidential Election of 1789: A Resource Guide from the Library of Congress
 A New Nation Votes: American Election Returns, 1787–1825
 
 Election of 1789 in Counting the Votes 

George Washington
John Adams
1788–1789 United States presidential election
Non-partisan elections
Presidency of George Washington
Presidential election 1788